Euriphene melanops is a butterfly in the family Nymphalidae. It is found in the Republic of the Congo and the Democratic Republic of the Congo (Mai-Ndombe, Uele, Kivu).

References

Butterflies described in 1897
Euriphene
Butterflies of Africa
Taxa named by Per Olof Christopher Aurivillius